Bear Haven Creek is a stream in the U.S. state of California. It is located in Mendocino County.

References

Rivers of Northern California
Rivers of Mendocino County, California